Ira Perley (November 9, 1799–February 26, 1874) was the chief justice of the New Hampshire Superior Court of Judicature 1855–1859 and 1864–1869.

Perley was born November 9, 1799, to Samuel and Phebe (Dresser) Perley.

Perley represented both Hanover and Concord in the New Hampshire House of Representatives.

Perley was appointed by Governor Samuel Dinsmoor Jr. as an associate justice of the Superior Court of Judicature on October 1852 and as the chief justice of the Superior Court of Judicature on July 20, 1855 by Governor Ralph Metcalf.  Perley resigned from the court on October 1, 1859, he was reappointed as Chief Justice on August 1, 1864, and he resigned again in September 1869.

Perley was elected a member of the American Antiquarian Society in 1866. In 1873, Perley was president of the New Hampshire Bar Association.

Perley died on February 26, 1874, in Concord, New Hampshire.

References

1799 births
1874 deaths
People from Concord, New Hampshire
Dartmouth College alumni
Chief Justices of the New Hampshire Supreme Court
Members of the New Hampshire House of Representatives
New Hampshire lawyers
Members of the American Antiquarian Society
19th-century American politicians
19th-century American judges
19th-century American lawyers